The December 2020 massacre in Wukro was a mass extrajudicial killing that took place in Wukro in the Tigray Region of Ethiopia during the Tigray War, on 30 December 2020. Wukro is a mid-sized town, capital of woreda Kilte Awulaelo, Eastern zone of Tigray.

Massacre
The Ethiopian National Defense Force (ENDF) and Eritrean Defence Forces killed 12 civilians in Wukro (Eastern Tigray) on 30 December 2020., as part of a series of killings in this martyr town. Typical massacres committed by Ethiopian and Eritrean soldiers in the Tigray war are (1) revenge when they lose a battle; (2) to terrorise and extract information about whereabouts of TPLF leaders; (3) murder of suspected family members of TDF fighters and (4) terrorising the Tigray society as a whole such as in case of mass killings in churches.

Perpetrators
Relatives and neighbours interpreted the identity of the perpetrators as Ethiopian and Eritrean soldiers.

Victims
The “Tigray: Atlas of the humanitarian situation” mentions a total of 12 victims. Many victims have been identified, but, as Wukro is a martyr town, affected by every phase of the Tigray war, the specific event in which victims died is not known yet. The EHRC–OHCHR Tigray investigation reported the massacres in this locality, without going into further detail.

Reactions
The series of massacres in Wukro received international attention in media articles. The “Tigray: Atlas of the humanitarian situation”, that documented this massacre received international media attention, particularly with regard its Annex A, that lists the massacres.

See also
 Bombing of Wukro
 Wukro massacre (November 2020)
 Wukro massacre (February 2021)
 Wukro massacre (March 2021)

References

External links
World Peace Foundation: Starving Tigray

Conflicts in 2020
Wars involving Eritrea
Wars involving Ethiopia
December 2020 crimes in Africa
Massacres committed by Eritrea
2020 massacres of the Tigray War